Christopher Douglas Tate (born 27 December 1977) is an English former footballer who played as a striker for various teams in the Football League.

Career
Born in York, North Yorkshire, Tate started his career in the York City youth system before signing for Sunderland in July 1996.

References

External links

1977 births
Living people
Footballers from York
English footballers
Association football forwards
York City F.C. players
Sunderland A.F.C. players
Scarborough F.C. players
Halifax Town A.F.C. players
Leyton Orient F.C. players
Stevenage F.C. players
Chester City F.C. players
Mansfield Town F.C. players
Goole A.F.C. players
English Football League players